Russell M. Nigro is a former justice of the Supreme Court of Pennsylvania. He first ran on the Democratic ticket in 1995. He ran for retention in 2005 but lost, thus making him the first Supreme Court Justice to lose a retention vote since such elections were first held in 1968.

The ousting of Justice Nigro was the direct result of public anger over a pay raise for members of all three branches of state government, which the General Assembly passed without public notice or debate in the early morning hours of July 7, 2005 and then-governor Ed Rendell quickly signed. Although Nigro was not a member of the state legislature, and so had not voted on the pay increase, executive and legislative elections would not be held until the following year, and so the public voiced its displeasure by denying retention to Justice Nigro.  Nigro received strong support from southeastern Pennsylvania, including his native Philadelphia, but met strong opposition in southwestern and southcentral Pennsylvania where anger over the pay raise was greatest.

As of 2014, Nigro was serving as chair of Philadelphia County's Board of Revision of Taxes, presiding over real estate tax appeals. Members of the BRT receive a salary of $70,000 for what the Philadelphia Inquirer has called a "part time" job.

Vacancy
Governor Rendell nominated Allegheny County Common Pleas Judge Cynthia Baldwin to temporarily fill the vacancy through January 2008.

See also

2005 Pennsylvania General Assembly pay raise controversy

References

Justices of the Supreme Court of Pennsylvania
Living people
Year of birth missing (living people)